William Hutchins (1792–1841) was an English churchman and academic.

William Hutchins may also refer to:
William Henry Hutchins (1843–1898), Canadian merchant and political figure
William John Hutchins (born 1939), English linguist and information scientist
William M. Hutchins (born 1944), American translator of modern Arabic literature
Will Hutchins (born 1930), American actor
William J. Hutchins (1813–1884), businessman and mayor of Houston
William M. Hutchins (born 1944), American academic, author and translator of contemporary Arabic literature
William James Hutchins, President of Berea College in Kentucky (1920–1939), father of Robert Maynard Hutchins

See also
William Hutchings (disambiguation)